The Men's rugby sevens tournament at the 2015 Pacific Games was held in Port Moresby from 8 to 10 July 2015 at the Sir John Guise Outdoor Stadium. Fiji won the gold medal defeating Samoa by 33–7 in the final. Tonga took the bronze medal defeating hosts PNG 19–12 in the third place match.

Participants
Ten teams played in the tournament:

Format
The teams were split into two pools of five, with a round-robin played in each pool. This was followed by a knockout stage which included the medal play-offs.

Pool A

Pool B

Knockout stage

Championship bracket

Quarterfinals

Semifinals

Bronze medal game

Gold medal game

Middle bracket

5th–8th semifinals

Seventh place game

Fifth place game

Lower bracket

Ninth place game

See also
 Rugby sevens at the 2015 Pacific Games – Women's tournament
 Rugby sevens at the Pacific Games
 Pacific Games

References

Men